Vogtherr is a surname. Notable people with the surname include:

Christoph Vogtherr (born 1965), German art historian
Ernest George Frederick Vogtherr (1898–1973), New Zealand bacon curer, businessman and art collector
Heinrich Vogtherr (1490–1556), Austrian artist, printer, poet and writer